Lincoln Academy may refer to:

 Lincoln Academy, US
 Lincoln Academy (Kings Mountain, North Carolina), US
 Old Lincoln High School, Tallahassee, Florida, US
 The Academy at Lincoln, Greensboro, North Carolina, US
 The Lincoln Academy of Illinois, US
 The Priory City of Lincoln Academy, Lincoln, Lincolnshire, England